These are the 1970 Five Nations Championship squads:

England

Head coach: Don White

 Mike Bulpitt
 Tony Bucknall
 Mike Davis
 David Duckham
 Keith Fairbrother
 Keith Fielding
 John Finlan
 Peter Hale
 Bob Hiller (c.)
 Barry Jackson
 Tony Jorden
 Peter Larter
 Mike Leadbetter
 John Novak
 John Pullin
 Gerry Redmond
 Roger Shackleton
 John Spencer
 Nigel Starmer-Smith
 Stack Stevens
 Bob Taylor
 Bryan West

France

Head coach: Fernand Cazenave

 Jean-Louis Azarete
 Jean-Pierre Bastiat
 René Benesis
 Jean-Louis Berot
 Pierre Biemouret
 Jean-Marie Bonal
 Roger Bourgarel
 Jack Cantoni
 Christian Carrère (c.)
 Elie Cester
 Benoît Dauga
 Jean Iracabal
 Michel Lasserre
 Jean le Droff
 Jean-Pierre Lux
 Alain Marot
 Lucien Paries
 Michel Pebeyre
 Marcel Puget
 Jean Sillieres
 Gérard Sutra
 Gérard Viard
 Pierre Villepreux
 Jean Trillo

Ireland

Head coach: Ronnie Dawson

 Barry Bresnihan
 William Brown
 Alan Duggan
 Mike Gibson
 Ken Goodall
 Ken Kennedy
 Tom Kiernan (c.)
 Ronnie Lamont
 Willie John McBride
 Barry McGann
 Syd Millar
 Mick Molloy
 Philo O'Callaghan
 Tony O'Reilly
 Fergus Slattery
 Roger Young

Scotland

Head coach: none

 Rodger Arneil
 Alastair Biggar
 Gordon Brown
 Peter Brown
 Sandy Carmichael
 Gordon Connell
 Tommy Elliot
 John Frame
 Sandy Hinshelwood
 Frank Laidlaw
 Wilson Lauder
 Ian McLauchlan
 Duncan Paterson
 Chris Rea
 Ian Robertson
 Ian Smith
 Mike Smith
 Peter Stagg
 Norm Suddon
 Jim Telfer (c.)
 Jock Turner
 Robert Young

Wales

Head coach: Clive Rowlands

 Phil Bennett
 Laurie Daniel
 Mervyn Davies
 John Dawes
 Gareth Edwards (c)
 Geoff Evans
 Stuart Gallacher
 Ian Hall
 Chico Hopkins
 Dennis Hughes
 Barry John
 Arthur Lewis
 Barry Llewelyn
 John Lloyd
 Roy Mathias
 Dai Morris
 Vic Perrins
 Billy Raybould
 Jim Shanklin
 John Taylor
 Delme Thomas
 Stuart Watkins
 Denzil Williams
 J. P. R. Williams

External links
1970 Five Nations Championship at ESPN

Six Nations Championship squads